Hypotia colchicalis is a species of snout moth in the genus Hypotia. It was described by Gottlieb August Wilhelm Herrich-Schäffer in 1851, and it is known from Portugal, Spain, Libya, Turkey and Russia.

The wingspan is 25–27 mm.

References

Moths described in 1851
Hypotiini